Edward Gwilliam (7 July 1877–1954) was an English footballer who played in the Football League for Wolverhampton Wanderers.

References

1877 births
1954 deaths
English footballers
Association football forwards
English Football League players
Shrewsbury Town F.C. players
Telford United F.C. players
Wolverhampton Wanderers F.C. players